A Thousand Songs is the debut solo album by Jim Guthrie, released in 2000 on Three Gut Records. It was also the first album ever released by that label. The song "Who Needs What" was covered by the indiepop band Tullycraft on their 2002 album Beat Surf Fun. The album was reissued in 2015 with 11 bonus tracks which consisted of completely re-recorded songs from the original album.

Track listing
 Introduction
 Santana's Theme
 Jigsaw Puzzle
 Not Yalk's Requiem
 Mr. Work's Stubborn
 I Love Broken Shoes
 The Fantabulous World of Jimmy 3-Guts
 Who Needs What
 I Don't Wanna Be a Rockstar
 Dirty Fingernail Dreams
 Thousand Songs
 Audio Pepsi
 Trust
 Sexy Drummer
 Not a Word
 Invisible Gem
 Wear in the World
 Shape of Things
 Let's Get in a Fight
 Focus on Floor Care
 Gamera
 Repression's Waltz
 Roads and Paper Routes
 And We Got Older

References

2000 debut albums
Jim Guthrie (singer-songwriter) albums
Three Gut Records albums